

The PZL-126 Mrówka (ant) is a Polish agricultural aircraft first flown in 1990. It is a diminutive low-wing monoplane of conventional if stubby appearance with a cruciform tail, an enclosed cabin and fixed, tricycle undercarriage. Significant parts of the design were undertaken by students at the training college attached to the PZL plant at Okęcie under the direction of Andrzej Słocinski, with the whole project treated initially as a platform for design innovation. Initial design work was completed in 1982 and detail work the following year. Plans to fly a prototype by 1985 were delayed by revisions to the aircraft's equipment, although a mockup was displayed at an agricultural aviation exhibition at Olsztyn that August. Legislation to outlaw certain agricultural chemicals was under consideration in Poland in the late 1980s, spurring interest in biological agents as an alternative and making a tiny aircraft like the Mrówka feasible as a useful piece of agricultural equipment.

The prototype was eventually flown on 20 April 1990. After initial testing, the design was revised and the prototype rebuilt as the PZL-126P, flying in this configuration on 20 October 2000. Flight testing commenced in 2003 and was still underway in 2005.

Specifications (as designed)

References

Notes

Bibliography

 "Agrolot PZL-126P Mrowka 2001". Jane's All the World's Aircraft 2005 (extract). London: Jane's Information Group.  
 Postlethwaite, Alan. "Poles back mini-ag aircraft". Flight International, 20 May 1989, p. 14. 
 Simpson, R. W. Airlife's General Aviation. Shrewsbury, UK: Airlife Publishing, 1995. 
 Taylor, John W. Jane's All the World's Aircraft 1987–88. London: Jane's Publishing, 1988. .
 Taylor, Michael J. H. Jane's Encyclopedia of Aviation. London: Studio Editions, 1989. .

1990s Polish agricultural aircraft
PZL aircraft
Low-wing aircraft
Single-engined tractor aircraft
Aircraft first flown in 1990